Madhya Pradesh Congress Committee (MPCC) is the Pradesh Congress Committee (state wing) of the Indian National Congress (INC) serving in the state of Madhya Pradesh. Current President of MPCC is Kamal Nath.

Structure and composition

Madhya Pradesh Legislative Assembly election

List of state presidents

List of chief ministers

Electoral performance

Factions
Madhya Pradesh Vikas Congress was a faction in the Congress Party from 1996 to 1998. MPVC was founded by former aviation minister Madhavrao Scindia, after he was refused an INC ticket for the 1996 Lok Sabha elections.

Scindia won a seat  as an MPVC candidate as a result of hard work & strong campaign led by his workers & followers who had also resigned from INC.
In 1998 MPVC merged into Indian National Congress.

See also
 Indian National Congress
 Congress Working Committee
 All India Congress Committee
 Pradesh Congress Committee
 Madhya Pradesh Youth Congress

Notes

References

External links
 Madhya Pradesh Congress Committee, Official website
 Indian National Congress, Official website

Indian National Congress by state or union territory
Politics of Madhya Pradesh